The Jordanian Pro League is a Jordanian professional league for men's football clubs and represents the top flight of Jordanian football. The championship consists of twelve competing teams in a home and away league system. 
The league not held in the years :
1948, 1953, 1957, 1958,
1967, 1968, 1969, and not finished in the 1998 in 2002 the league change calendar to a fall spring season.
In 2020 the league return to a spring fall season.

Competition format

Competition
There are 12 clubs in the Premier League. During the course of a season (from March to October) each club plays the others twice (a double round-robin system), once at their home stadium and once at that of their opponents', for 22 games. Teams receive three points for a win and one point for a draw. No points are awarded for a loss. Teams are ranked by total points, then goal difference, and then goals scored. If still equal, teams are deemed to occupy the same position. If there is a tie for the championship, for relegation, or for qualification to other competitions, a play-off match at a neutral venue decides rank.

Promotion and relegation
A system of promotion and relegation exists between the Jordan Premier League and the Jordan League Division 1. The two lowest placed teams in Premier League are relegated to the League Division 1, and the top two teams from the League Division 1 are promoted to the Premier League.

Qualification for Asian competitions
At present, the winners of Jordan Premier League qualify for the AFC Champions League group stage, and the league runners-up qualify for the AFC Cup group stage alongside the winners of Jordan FA Cup. Jordan is one of the most successful countries in the AFC Cup with three titles second after Kuwait, 2 for Al-Faisaly (2005 and 2006) and 1 for Shabab Al-Ordon (2007), more than any other country who has their clubs eligible to play in the AFC Cup.

Clubs

Champions
Source:

Total titles won by club 
Source:

Total titles won by city

Total titles won by governorate

Doubles 
Three teams have won the double of the Jordanian Premier League and the Jordan FA Cup in the same season.

2023-2024 season

Map

Players

Top scorers by season
Source:

All-time top scorers
Source:

See also
 Jordan League Division 1 (men's)
 Jordan Women's Football League

References

External links
Federation website
League at fifa.com
League at soccerway.com
Jordan Premier League - Hailoosport.com (Arabic)
Jordan Premier League - Hailoosport.com

 
1
Top level football leagues in Asia
Sports leagues established in 1944
1944 establishments in Transjordan